Mohammad Faghiri (born January 14, 1985, Iran) is an Iranian wrestler.

References

Living people
Iranian male sport wrestlers
1985 births
21st-century Iranian people